Goderich is an affluent neighborhood in the  west end  of Freetown, Sierra Leone's capital. Goderich lies about 13 miles (20 kilometers) from downtown Freetown.  Goderich had a population 19,209 in the 2004 census  Goderich has a high standard of living and is the wealthiest neighborhood in Freetown.

Notable current residents of Goderich include a former president of Sierra Leone, Ernest Bai Koroma, and a former vice president of Sierra Leone, Solomon Berewa.

References

Western Area
Neighbourhoods in Freetown
Sierra Leone Liberated African villages

Populated places established by Sierra Leone Creoles